The Parkway Playhouse, located in Burnsville, North Carolina, is the oldest continually operating summer theater in North Carolina.

It was established in 1947 by Dr. William Raymond Taylor, a professor of drama at Woman's College on Greensboro, North Carolina (now the University of North Carolina-Greensboro.

The Parkway Playhouse, for many years, was operated as a summer stock venue and a sponsored extension of the drama departments at UNC-G and the University of Miami.  In the 1990s the Parkway Playhouse became an independent theater company, and is now operating as a small professional theater company serving the mountain region of Western North Carolina.  It is housed in the (Former) Burnsville High School Gymnasium in the Yancey Collegiate Institute Historic District.

See also
 Nu-Wray Inn

References

External links
Official site

Theatre companies in North Carolina
Theatres in Burnsville, North Carolina